Marina González Lara (born 15 December 2002) is a Spanish artistic gymnast. She won the gold medal on floor exercise at the 2019 FIG World Challenge Cup in Szombathely. She competed at the 2019 World Championships and helped Spain qualify as a full team for the 2020 Olympic Games.

Personal life 
Marina González was born on 15 December 2002, in Malgrat de Mar, Catalonia, Spain. She speaks both Catalan and Spanish. She trained in athletics and taekwondo before gymnastics, and competed at the Catalan regional taekwondo championships, but she switched to gymnastics when she was eight.

Career 
González was supposed to compete at the 2018 Mediterranean Games, but she injured her elbow and was out of competition for the rest of the year.

González won the silver medal in the all-around at the 2019 Spanish National Championships behind Ana Pérez. She won the gold medal on the floor exercise at the Szombathely World Cup with a score of 12.866. At the 2019 World Championships, González competed with teammates Cintia Rodríguez, Roxana Popa, Ana Pérez, and Alba Petisco. They finished 12th as a team during qualifications, and although they did not qualify to the team final, they qualified a team to the 2020 Olympic Games in Tokyo, giving Spain its first team berth at the Olympic Games since 2004.

González won the bronze medal in the all-around at the 2020 Spanish National Championships behind Alba Petisco and Ana Pérez.

In 2021, González was selected to the Spanish women's artistic gymnastics team for the postponed 2020 Summer Olympics alongside Laura Bechdejú, Alba Petisco and Roxana Popa. The team finished 12th in qualifications and did not reach the final.

In August 2021, González signed with Iowa State University, joining their gymnastics team for the 2021–2022 season.

Competitive history

References

External links 
 
 

2002 births
Living people
Spanish female artistic gymnasts
Gymnasts from Barcelona
Gymnasts at the 2020 Summer Olympics
Olympic gymnasts of Spain
Iowa State Cyclones women's gymnasts
21st-century Spanish women